Huan-a is a Hokkien word which means foreigner. 番 means 'foreign', and 仔 is a Hokkien diminutive noun suffix. This term may be perceived as derogatory by non-Chinese speakers in certain countries, such as in Taiwan. 

Chinese Filipinos, Chinese Indonesians, Chinese Malaysians, and Chinese Singaporeans use this word to refer to non-ethnic-Chinese Southeast Asians. During the Japanese occupation of Taiwan, the Japanese were called huan-a by Han Taiwanese, with geisha called hoan-á-ke (番仔雞, lit. "foreign chicken") and the wives of Japanese men called hoan-á-chiú-kan (番仔酒矸, lit. "foreign liquor bottle"). Huan-a is now commonly used in Taiwan to refer to indigenous peoples (the Taiwanese aborigines). In Penang, Malaysia, huan-a is used to refer to Malays, whereas ang moh (紅毛) refers to Europeans and Kling na (吉零仔) refers to Tamils. In the Philippines, huan-a is what Chinese Filipinos use to refer to native Filipinos or any non-ethnic-Chinese Filipino, such as Filipino Mestizos or Spanish Filipinos, Japanese Filipinos, Korean Filipinos, Indian Filipinos, Iranian Filipinos, & etc.. In previous times, the term was used by Han Chinese to refer to Mongolian invaders. Basically, Huan-a connotes "alien foreigner".

In another case, the word fan-kui ( is a Mandarin Chinese word which means evil foreigner. 鬼 means 'ghost' or 'evil'. This phrase is used by overseas Chinese to imply non-Chinese people who are known for their bad habits or rude character. .

References

Chinese slang
Southern Min words and phrases
Pejorative terms for in-group non-members